Joseph Lanning Barber (March 24, 1864 – April 6, 1940) was a medical doctor and a member of the Wisconsin State Senate and the Wisconsin State Assembly.

Biography
Barber was born on March 24, 1864 in Hayton, Wisconsin. He attended the University of Illinois at Urbana-Champaign. In 1899, he married Ella Webb. Their daughter, Mildred Barber Abel, became a member of the Wisconsin State Assembly. It marked the first time a father and daughter served together in a state legislature in the history of the United States. Barber was a member of the Methodist Episcopal Church, as well as Modern Woodmen of America.

After Barber first began practicing medicine, he became Health Officer of Greenwood, Wisconsin and Coroner of Clark County, Wisconsin before moving to Collins, Wisconsin. He moved to Marathon City, Wisconsin in 1906 and opened a practice and later a pharmacy.

After serving as President of Marathon, Wisconsin, Barber was elected to the Senate in 1922, where he served two terms. He was also a delegate to the 1920 Republican National Convention. Barber was first elected to the Assembly in 1925 and was re-elected in 1928 and 1934. He was a member of the Progressive Party. In addition, he was a member of the Marathon County, Wisconsin Board of Supervisors from 1924 to 1925 and again from 1931 to 1932.

He died at his home on April 6, 1940 and is buried in Wausau, Wisconsin.

References

External links

People from Calumet County, Wisconsin
People from Greenwood, Wisconsin
People from Manitowoc County, Wisconsin
People from Marathon, Wisconsin
Republican Party Wisconsin state senators
Republican Party members of the Wisconsin State Assembly
County supervisors in Wisconsin
American coroners
Physicians from Wisconsin
University of Illinois Urbana-Champaign alumni
1864 births
1940 deaths